The Consumers, Estate Agents and Redress Act 2007 is an Act of the Parliament of the United Kingdom. The Bill for this Act was introduced into the Parliament of the United Kingdom on 16 November 2006 and completed its passage through the House of Lords on 6 February 2007. It was introduced, and given its First Reading, in the House of Commons on 7 February 2007 and its Third Reading on Monday 19 March 2007.

Section 66 - Commencement
Orders made under this section:
The Consumers, Estate Agents and Redress Act 2007 (Commencement No. 1) Order 2007 (S.I. 2007/2934 (C.116))
The Consumers, Estate Agents and Redress Act 2007 (Commencement No. 2) Order 2007 (S.I. 2007/3546 (C.154))
The Consumers, Estate Agents and Redress Act 2007 (Commencement No. 3 and Supplementary Provision) Order 2008 (S.I. 2008/1262 (C.53))
The Consumers, Estate Agents and Redress Act 2007 (Commencement No. 4) Order 2008 (S.I. 2008/905 (C.43))
The Consumers, Estate Agents and Redress Act 2007 (Commencement No. 5 and Savings and Transitional Provisions) Order 2008 (S.I. 2008/2550 (C.111))

References
Halsbury's Statutes,

External links
The Consumers, Estate Agents and Redress Act 2007, as amended from the National Archives.
The Consumers, Estate Agents and Redress Act 2007, as originally enacted from the National Archives.
Explanatory notes to the Consumers, Estate Agents and Redress Act 2007.

United Kingdom Acts of Parliament 2007